Chauliodes is a genus of fishflies in the family Corydalidae. There are about five described species in Chauliodes.

Species
These five species belong to the genus Chauliodes:
 Chauliodes carsteni Wichard, 2003
 Chauliodes pectinicornis (Linnaeus, 1763) – summer fishfly
 Chauliodes priscus Pictet, 1856
 Chauliodes rastricornis Rambur, 1842 – spring fishfly
 Chauliodes schneideri Risso, 1827

References

Further reading

External links

 

Corydalidae
Articles created by Qbugbot
Aquatic insects